KCTB may refer to:

 KCTB-LP, a low-power radio station (94.1 FM) licensed to Lonepine, Montana, United States
 the ICAO code for Cut Bank Municipal Airport in the U.S. state of Montana